Rhiannon Giddens (born February 21, 1977) is an American musician. She is a founding member of the country, blues and old-time music band the Carolina Chocolate Drops, where she was the lead singer, fiddle player, and banjo player.

Giddens is a native of Greensboro, North Carolina. In addition to her work with the Grammy-winning Chocolate Drops, Giddens has released two solo albums: Tomorrow Is My Turn (2015) and Freedom Highway (2017). Her 2019 and 2021 albums, There Is No Other and  They're Calling Me Home are collaborations with Italian multi-instrumentalist Francesco Turrisi. She appears in the Smithsonian Folkways collection documenting Mike Seeger's final trip through Appalachia in 2009, Just Around The Bend: Survival and Revival in Southern Banjo Styles – Mike Seeger’s Last Documentary (2019).  In 2014, she participated in the T Bone Burnett-produced project titled The New Basement Tapes along with several other musicians, which set a series of recently discovered Bob Dylan lyrics to newly composed music.  The resulting album, Lost on the River: The New Basement Tapes, was a top-40 Billboard album.

Early life
Giddens is of multiracial ancestry. Her father, David Giddens, is European-American. Her mother, Deborah Jamieson, is a descendant of African Americans and Native American tribes including the Lumbee, Occaneechi, and Seminole. David and Deborah met as college students in the city of Greensboro, North Carolina. Giddens' parents separated soon after her birth, when Deborah Giddens came out as a lesbian.

Giddens and her sister grew up in Greensboro and nearby rural Gibsonville. Her sister Lalenja Harrington is a director for Beyond Academics, a four-year certificate program supporting students with intellectual and developmental disabilities, at the University of North Carolina at Greensboro. A singer and songwriter herself, Harrington occasionally collaborates with her sister on musical projects.

Musical career

Giddens is an alumna of the North Carolina School of Science and Mathematics, and a 2000 graduate of Oberlin Conservatory at Oberlin College, where she studied opera.

In 2005, Giddens, who at that time was spending time competing in Scottish traditional music competitions (specializing in the Gaelic lilting tradition, also known as mouth music), attended the Black Banjo Then and Now Gathering, in Boone, North Carolina. There she met Dom Flemons and Sule Greg Wilson. The three started playing together professionally as  a "postmodern string band", Sankofa Strings. During that same time period, Giddens was also a regular caller at local contra dances and featured in a Celtic music band called Gaelwynd. Later in 2005, after both Gaelwynd and Sankofa Strings had released CD albums, Giddens and Flemons teamed up with other musicians and expanded the Sankofa Strings sound into what was to become the Grammy winning Carolina Chocolate Drops.

In 2007, Giddens contributed fiddle, banjo, "flat-footin'" dancing and additional vocals to Talitha MacKenzie's album Indian Summer.

Performing as a soprano, Giddens and mezzo-soprano Cheryse McLeod Lewis formed a duo called Eleganza to release a CD in 2009. Because I Knew You... consists of classical, religious, theater, and movie music. Giddens and Lewis were middle school classmates who reconnected after college while working in the same office. The friends started singing together in 2003, but did not begin recording until 2008.

As of November 12, 2013, Giddens became the only original member of the Carolina Chocolate Drops.

In 2013, Giddens began pushing further into her solo career. Giddens participated in "Another Day, Another Time", a concert inspired by the Coen brothers film Inside Llewyn Davis. Many critics have stated that Giddens had the best performance at what was called "the concert of the year". Late in 2013, Giddens contributed the standout a cappella track "We Rise" to the LP We Are Not For Sale: Songs of Protest by the NC Music Love Army – a collective of activist musicians from North Carolina founded by Jon Lindsay and Caitlin Cary. Giddens' protest song joins contributions from many other Carolina musical luminaries on the Lindsay-produced compilation (11/26/13 via Redeye Distribution), which was created to support the NC NAACP and the Moral Monday movement.

In early 2014 Giddens recorded for Lost on the River: The New Basement Tapes alongside Elvis Costello, Marcus Mumford, Taylor Goldsmith and Jim James. The album was produced by T-Bone Burnett and is a compilation of partial, unreleased lyrics written by Bob Dylan.

In February 2015, Giddens released her debut solo album, Tomorrow Is My Turn, on Nonesuch Records. Also produced by Burnett, the album includes songs made famous by Patsy Cline, Odetta, Dolly Parton, and Nina Simone, among others. The Wall Street Journal said the album "confirms the arrival of a significant talent whose voice and distinctive approach communicate the simmering emotion at the core of the songs." Additionally, the Los Angeles Times called the album "a collection that should solidify her status as one of the bright new lights in pop music."

In July 2015, she had a big stage at world music folk and dance festival at TFF Rudolstadt in Germany. Her performance was also broadcast live by the German national public radio Deutschlandfunk. Rhiannon appears on Jon Lindsay's single "Ballad of Lennon Lacy" (Redeye Distribution, August 21). The song tackles the mysterious hanging death of Lennon Lacy, a black teen from rural Bladenboro, North Carolina.

On November 27, 2015, to coincide with the Black Friday Record Store Day event, Giddens released Factory Girl (EP) on Nonesuch Records, which contained music culled from the same T Bone Burnett–produced sessions that yielded Tomorrow Is My Turn. A digital version of Factory Girl was made available December 11, 2015. The sessions for the album and EP took place in Los Angeles and Nashville, with a multi-generational group of players assembled by Burnett. Musicians on Factory Girl include Burnett; fiddle player Gabe Witcher and double bassist Paul Kowert of Punch Brothers; percussionist Jack Ashford of Motown's renowned Funk Brothers; drummer Jay Bellerose; guitarist Colin Linden; veteran Nashville session bassist Dennis Crouch; and Giddens's Carolina Chocolate Drops touring band-mates, multi-instrumentalist Hubby Jenkins and beat-boxer Adam Matta.

Rhiannon appeared on Jools Holland's Hootenanny on December 31, 2015, shown on BBC Two. She performed songs from her 2015 album Tomorrow Is My Turn, including "Waterboy" and a cover of "St James Infirmary Blues" with Tom Jones.

She was selected to take part in Transatlantic Sessions in January 2016.  This collaboration between American and Celtic musicians is a coveted honor. The ensemble performed as part of Celtic Connections in Glasgow, and a short UK/Irish tour.  Her performances on the tour included the stirring tribute to David Bowie  "It Ain't Easy". Later in the year, Giddens became the first American to be honored as Folk Singer of the Year at the BBC Radio 2 Folk Awards. Later in the year, it was also announced that she would be receiving the prestigious Steve Martin Prize for Excellence in Banjo and Bluegrass. Winning this award makes Giddens both the only woman and the only person of color to receive the prize in its six-year history. In 2016, it was also announced that Giddens and the Carolina Chocolate Drops would be inducted into the North Carolina Music Hall of Fame.

In 2017, Giddens became only the fourth musician to perform at both the Newport Folk and Jazz Festivals. Later that year, she delivered the keynote address at the World of Bluegrass Business Conference 2017. According to Bluegrass Today, "Giddens shattered long-held stereotypes...By the time she was done, she had systematically dismantled the myth of a homogenous Appalachia." In June 2017, Giddens appeared in the multi award-winning documentary The American Epic Sessions, directed by Bernard MacMahon, where she recorded "One Hour Mama" and English folk ballad "Pretty Saro", on the restored first electrical sound recording system from the 1920s. Both performances were released on Music from The American Epic Sessions: Original Motion Picture Soundtrack. Upon hearing the playback of these direct-to-disc recordings, she exclaimed "you feel like your soul is coming out of the speaker."

In October 2017, Giddens was named one of the 2017 class of MacArthur "Genius" Fellows. The organization noted, "Giddens's drive to understand and convey the nuances, complexities, and interrelationships between musical traditions is enhancing our musical present with a wealth of sounds and textures from the past." Rhiannon further demonstrated the broad range of her musical interests with several subsequent projects. In early November, she performed as a soprano with the Louisville Orchestra in Teddy Abrams' multimedia tribute to Muhammad Ali, The Greatest. A week later, she sang with the Cincinnati Pops Orchestra for their live recording of American Originals: 1918, which explored the early development of jazz during the post WWI era. In January 2018, Giddens co-produced (with Dirk Powell) Songs of Our Native Daughters for Smithsonian Folkways. Written and recorded with fellow artists Amythyst Kiah, Leyla McCalla, and Allison Russell, "The album confronts the ways we are culturally conditioned to avoid talking about America's history of slavery, racism, and misogyny." Also in early 2018, the Nashville Ballet announced that Rhiannon Giddens has been commissioned to write the music for Lucy Negro, Redux, a new dance choreographed by artistic director, Paul Vasterling. Based on the book of the same name by Caroline Randall Williams, its premise is that Shakespeare's Dark Lady was of African descent. The ballet premiered in February 2019.  Then in March 2018, Giddens fulfilled a previously announced engagement as guest curator for the Cambridge Folk Festival by inviting Peggy Seeger, Kaia Kater, Birds of Chicago, Amythyst Kiah, and Yola Carter to perform at the event.

Giddens recorded vocals for Silo Songs, an audio installation created by composer Brad Wells for Hancock Shaker Village. She contributed a song, "Mountain Hymn", to the popular video game Red Dead Redemption 2 which was released in October 2018. The song was written with Daniel Lanois. Beginning in December 2018, she is hosting a podcast called Aria Code with Rhiannon Giddens produced by the Metropolitan Opera and WQXR-FM. The program examines why individual arias have a lasting impact on audiences and how singers prepare to perform them. In 2019, Giddens released two studio albums: Songs of Our Native Daughters with Allison Russell, Leyla McCalla and Amythyst Kiah, and There Is No Other with Italian musician Francesco Turrisi.

For the 2020 Spoleto Festival USA, Rhiannon Giddens was commissioned to create an opera based on the Arabic language autobiography of Omar Ibn Said, a highly literate and cultured Torodbe (Muslim cleric)  from the Fula people of modern Senegal, who was enslaved in an intertribal war against the Imamate of Futa Toro and brought aboard a slave ship to Charleston, South Carolina in 1807. Giddens wrote the libretto and served as lead composer with help from co-composer Michael Abels. Owing to the COVID-19 pandemic, the world premiere of Omar was postponed until 2022. 

In July 2020, Giddens was named Artistic Director of the cross-cultural music organization Silkroad (arts organization). The position had been vacant since 2017 when Silkroad's founder, Yo-Yo Ma, stepped down.

On , Giddens guest-hosted the BBC Radio 2 Blues Show whilst its regular host Cerys Matthews was on her holidays.

Giddens earned an Honorary Doctor of Letters from the University of North Carolina at Greensboro for her lasting impact on the UNCG community and work in music. She sang "Calling me Home" by Alice Gerrard at a virtual commencement after accepting the degree in December 2020.

Acting
In 2017 and 2018, Giddens appeared in the fifth and sixth seasons of the CMT's Nashville as Hannah Lee "Hallie" Jordan, a social worker and gospel singer who is a significant character in Juliette's storyline. Giddens appeared in 11 episodes and performed several songs that have been made available following each episode.

Author
Rhiannon Giddens has announced that she will have four children's books published by Candlewick Press. The first two books, scheduled for release in Fall 2022, are based on the lyrics of her songs “Build A House” and "We Could Fly" with illustrations by Monica Mikai and Briana Mukodiri Uchendu respectively.

Personal life
Giddens married Irish traditional musician Michael Laffan in 2007. They have a daughter born in 2009 and a son born in 2013. They had separated as of 2018. She lives in Limerick, Ireland. In 2019, Giddens began a relationship with her Italian musical partner Francesco Turrisi. They released an album together in May 2019 and again in April 2021.

Awards and nominations

Discography

As member of Carolina Chocolate Drops

As member of Gaelwynd
 Out on the Ocean: Music of the British Isles (2004)
 Northern Lights (2005)

As member of The New Basement Tapes
 Lost on the River: The New Basement Tapes (2014)

As Rhiannon Giddens
 We Rise (EP) (2014)
 Tomorrow Is My Turn (2015)
 Factory Girl (EP) (2015)
 Live at Jazzfest 2016 (2016)
 Freedom Highway (2017)
 Live at Jazzfest 2017 (2017)
 There Is No Other  (2019)
 Cruel World (single) (2019)
 Just the Two of Us  (single) (2020)
 Don't Call Me Names (single) (2020)
 They're Calling Me Home  (2021)
 Julie's Aria  (single) (2022)
 Build A House  (single) (2022)

As member of Our Native Daughters
 Songs of Our Native Daughters (2019)

Additional collaborations
 As member of Sankofa Strings, Colored Aristocracy (2005)
 As Elftones & Rhiannon Giddens, All the Pretty Horses  (2009)
 As Laurelyn Dossett, Rhiannon Giddens, Eric Robertson & Bennett Sullivan, The Music of Beautiful Star (2009)
 As Eleganza (with Cheryse McLeod Lewis), Because I Knew You... (2009)
 As Mike Compton, Laurelyn Dossett, Rhiannon Giddens, Joe Newberry, Jason Sypher, The Gathering (2011)
 As The Giddens Sisters (with Lalenja Harrington), I Know I've Been Changed (2013)
 As Ben Harper and Rhiannon Giddens, Black Eyed Dog (single) (2020)
 As Amanda Palmer and Rhiannon Giddens, It's a Fire (single) (2020)
 As Renée Fleming, Alison Krauss, Rhiannon Giddens, and Yannick Nézet-Séguin, Before the Deluge (single) (2021)

Nashville
See Nashville discography Seasons Five and Six for songs performed by Hallie Jordan (played by Rhiannon Giddens)

Other significant appearances (lead, duet, trio, featured solo)
 "Dreamland" and "Clothes of My Man", Sonic New York (Sxip Shirey) (2010)
 "Brightest and Best", "Christ Child Lullaby", "A Babe is Born All of a Maid", and "Down in Yon Forest", The Winter Moon (Immigrant's Daughter) (2010)
 "Lay Your Money Down", Shamrock City (Solas) (2012)
 "Outside Man Blues", Yes We Can (An Apple A Day) (2013)
 "The Vanishing Race", Look Again to the Wind: Johnny Cash's Bitter Tears Revisited (Various Artists) (2014)
 "Now to Conclude Our Christmas Mirth", "Christmas Day Is Come", and "The Enniscorthy Christmas Carol", The Wexford Carols (Caitríona O'Leary) (2014)
 "Waterboy", "'S iomadh rud tha dhìth orm / Ciamar a nì mi 'n dannsa dìreach", and "Didn't Leave Nobody But The Baby", Another Day, Another Time: Celebrating the Music of Inside Llewyn Davis (Various artists) (concert recorded live September 29, 2013, album released January 2015)
 "Up In Arms", Rhythm & Reason (Bhi Bhiman) (2015)
 "Julie" and "Cluck Old Hen", Tunes from David Holt's State of Music (Various Artists) (2015)
 "Ballad of Lennon Lacy" (single) (Jon Lindsay with Rhiannon Giddens and NC Music Love Army) (2015)
 "Kill a Word", Mr. Misunderstood (Eric Church) (2015)
 "The Good Fight", Real Midnight (Birds of Chicago) (2016)
 "St. James Infirmary Blues", Sing Me Home (Yo-Yo Ma & The Silk Road Ensemble) (2016)
 "Manman", A Day for the Hunter, A Day for the Prey (Leyla McCalla) (2016)
 "Come Sunday" and "Rocks in My Bed", American Tunes (Allen Toussaint) (2016)
 "Woman of Constant Sorrow", "Just Drive By, Firefly", and "Bach, Stevie Wonder and Janelle Monae", A Bottle of Whiskey and a Handful of Bees (Sxip Shirey) (2017)
 "West End Blues (Live)" and "Shake Sugaree", Tunes from David Holt's State of Music 2 (Various Artists) (2017)
 "One Hour Mama" and "Pretty Saro", Music from The American Epic Sessions (Various Artists) (2017)
 "Factory Girl" and "Lullaby", Folk Songs (Kronos Quartet) (2017)
 "So Pretty", For Lenny (Lara Downes) (2018)
 "My Baby Likes Bacon" and "Mansell's Waltz", Hopes & Dreams: The Lullaby Project (Various Artists) (2018)
 "I'm Just Wild About Harry", "I Ain't Gonna Play No Second Fiddle", "Swing Along", and "I Ain't Got Nobody", American Originals: 1918 (Cincinnati Pops Orchestra) (2018)
 "Dream Variation", Holes In The Sky (Lara Downes) (2019)
 "The May Morning Dew", The Great Irish Songbook (Dervish) (2019)
 "Georgia Buck" and "Cripple Creek", Just Around the Bend: Survival and Revival in Southern Banjo Sounds (Mike Seeger's Last Documentary) (Various Artists) (2019)
 "Moonlight", "Mountain Hymn", and "Mountain Banjo", The Music of Red Dead Redemption 2: Original Soundtrack (Various Artists) (2019)
 "All Babies Must Cry" (single) (Sxip Shirey) (2019)
 "Wish in Vain" (w/ Dirk Powell), Good Music to Avert the Collapse of American Democracy, Volume 2 (Various Artists) (2020 1-day benefit release)
 "All You Fascists Bound To Lose" (written by Woody Guthrie), This Joy (Resistance Revival Chorus) (2020, Righteous Babe Records)
 "Woman of the House", Canvas (Natalie MacMaster and Donnell Leahy) (2023)

References

Further reading

External links 

 
 
 
 
 

1977 births
21st-century African-American women singers
African-American banjoists
African-American country musicians
African-American women songwriters
American banjoists
American country singer-songwriters
American multi-instrumentalists
American people of Native American descent
American people of Lumbee descent
American people of Seminole descent
American women country singers
Black Seminole people
The Carolina Chocolate Drops members
Country musicians from North Carolina
Grammy Award winners
Living people
MacArthur Fellows
Musicians from Greensboro, North Carolina
North Carolina School of Science and Mathematics alumni
Oberlin Conservatory of Music alumni
Scottish Gaelic singers
Singer-songwriters from North Carolina
The New Basement Tapes members